Nomophila triticalis is a moth in the family Crambidae. It was discovered by Carlos Berg in 1875 and is found in Argentina.

References

Moths described in 1875
Spilomelinae
Taxa named by Carlos Berg